1985 Grand Prix may refer to:

 1985 Grand Prix (snooker)
 1985 Grand Prix (tennis)